Norchad Omier (born 28 August 2001) is a Nicaraguan college basketball player for Miami Hurricanes of the Atlantic Coast Conference. He previously played for the Arkansas State Red Wolves of the Sun Belt Conference (SBC).

Early life and high school career
A native of Bluefields, Nicaragua, Omier grew up playing several sports, including baseball. He started playing basketball by the age of 13 after a local coach noticed his height. Omier trained at La Academica de Basketball Bluefields in his hometown. He explored professional opportunities in Mexico before joining Miami Prep in Miami, Florida on a full scholarship. Omier averaged 26.7 points and 20.3 rebounds per game, and recorded 40 points and 17 rebounds against IMG Academy. He committed to play college basketball for Arkansas State over offers from Iona, Mercer, UMBC and Marist, and became the first Nicaraguan to sign an NCAA Division I basketball scholarship. He joined the Red Wolves under Spanish-speaking head coach Mike Balado, who was mentored by Miami Prep founder Art Alvarez.

College career
On 16 January 2021, Omier posted a freshman season-high 22 points and 17 rebounds in a 93–72 win against Louisiana–Monroe. As a freshman, he averaged 12.6 points and 12.3 rebounds per game, earning First Team All-Sun Belt and Freshman of the Year honors. Omier became the fourth Division I freshman since the 1992–93 season to average at least 12 points and 12 rebounds. At the conclusion of the 2021-22 regular season, Omier was named Sun Belt Player of the Year and Defensive Player of the Year.

National team career
In April 2021, Omier made his national team debut for Nicaragua during 2023 FIBA Basketball World Cup qualification.

Career statistics

College

|-
| style="text-align:left;"| 2020–21
| style="text-align:left;"| Arkansas State
| 23 || 22 || 26.7 || .539 || .000 || .688 || 12.3 || .8 || 1.2 || 1.4 || 12.6

References

External links
Arkansas State Red Wolves bio

2001 births
Living people
Arkansas State Red Wolves men's basketball players
Miami Hurricanes men's basketball players
Nicaraguan expatriate sportspeople in the United States
Nicaraguan men's basketball players
People from Bluefields
Power forwards (basketball)
Small forwards